Nagpada is a neighbourhood in South Mumbai. 

The place derives its name from a local Shiva temple, and abode of Naag or the snake wound around Shiva's neck. It has a community basketball court.

In 2005, Nagpada was the location of the Sadaf Manzil building collapse.

In April 2018, the Nagpada junction was beautified with a 25 metre national flag along with a mural dedicated to Bharat Ratna Abul Kalam Azad. The area was a meeting point for pre-independence gatherings and has witnessed many political movements during the pre-independence era. It was designed by architect Hafeez Contractor and inaugurated by Mumbai Mayor Vishwanath Mahadeshwar.

References 

Neighbourhoods in Mumbai